Third Watch is an American television drama series which first aired on NBC from 1999 to 2005 and followed the lives of an ensemble cast of characters portraying police officers of the New York City Police Department (NYPD) and firefighters and paramedics of the New York City Fire Department (FDNY).

Chronology of the characters along the series

Maurice 'Bosco' Boscorelli

Maurice Louis "Bosco" Boscorelli is a fictional NYPD police officer on the television series Third Watch. He was played by Jason Wiles. 'Bosco' was one of the few cast members to stay on the show for its entire six season run. Only his mother and his girlfriends ever call him "Maurice", while his brother calls him "Mo"; otherwise, he is known as "Boz", "Bosco" or "Boscorelli" to everyone else. Bosco grew up as the eldest of two children to his parents, Anthony and (Angela) Rose Boscorelli. His father was an abusive, alcoholic parent who used to beat him and his brother Michael, as well as his mother. Anthony Boscorelli used to creep back into the house after drinking via Bosco's bedroom window; As a result, Bosco cannot sleep with the bedroom window open. Bosco's parents split up on January 18, 1981, an event which affected the young man deeply.

Bosco joined the United States Army Rangers and served for a few years before returning to New York, where he joined the Police Academy. Here he met Faith, who would become his partner at the 55th Precinct and his only true trusted friend. The two worked together, although they often disagreed. The relationship was similar to a mother-child one, in that Faith frequently treated him the way she treated her children. Bosco was liked by Faith's children Emily and Charlie (who called him "Uncle Bosco") but not by her husband Fred. As an officer, Bosco tends to behave as a stereotypical macho "hard ass" male, ignoring "boring" calls in favor of wanting top jobs to play "super cop" on, staking out crime hotspots to watch suspects scope out cars and waits for a theft to occur so he could then charge in and make an arrest.  He shows a disregard for orders, often ignores the radio, and puts his best friend and police partner Faith Yokas into difficult situations with him; leading to regular trouble with colleagues and superiors.

Bosco isn't too keen on the dark, or for needles. His "team" is the New York Giants, and his favorite TV programs are sports and nature documentaries. Politically, he supports the Republicans and is an admirer of Rudy Giuliani.  Despite his stream of sexual encounters, Bosco did not lose his virginity until his 20s. His past relationships include: the captain's daughter, with them having sex caught on tape, but her face was luckily hidden; an upper-class woman named Nicole; and police officer Sgt. Maritza Cruz. Ultimately, Bosco wants to find the perfect woman to settle down and have a family; he likes children, despite not having any of his own. Bosco has a kind side, helping Tyrone 'Ty' Davis Jr. to cure his partner, officer John 'Sully' Sullivan, of alcoholism.  Bosco also had a fairly aggressive rivalry with firefighter Jimmy Doherty for some time, though by the series' end it had seemed to fade - Doherty saw Bosco making out with Jimmy's ex-wife Kim Zambrano early in series two.

Bosco's "act now, think later" attitude got him into trouble numerous times, such as going into a burning building to save people only to suffer smoke inhalation, and heading into an abandoned building to get rid of squatters, not realising that a schizophrenic man wanted for shooting paramedic Jerry Mancowicz was hiding in there. Bosco attempted to remove him from the building but was shot in his vest, playing dead before spear-tackling him out the second story window; Bosco only suffered minor injuries. For the most part, Bosco and Faith were seen as the ‘perfect cop partnership’, as Bosco's aggressive toughness balanced his partner's level-headedness. But on occasion Bosco found himself as "the adult" when it came to dealing with Faith's problems.

In an attempt to advance his career, Bosco tried heavily to get into the NYPD's Emergency Service Unit, even working for a time with ESU veteran Glen Hobart; however, Hobart was already on a self-destructive path - holding a gun to his head on the roof of a building and daring ESU snipers to kill him, which they did, thereby leaving Bosco very shaken. That shock progressed further after a seemingly ordinary chase with a bank robber, in which the bag with the cash exploded in Bosco's face and triggered a massive panic attack.  Bosco was sent to see a counsellor who didn't do much to help; he eventually turned to Faith, breaking down and revealing how much the Hobart incident, as well as the pressure of the September 11th attacks, were really troubling him.  (On that day, Bosco heard the first plane hit the World Trade Center and rushed to the scene, but fled when the towers collapsed, leading to his vulnerability to panic attacks many months afterwards). After his failed attempt to get into ESU, Bosco then tried to get onto the Anti-Crime team. This time he was successful, and worked closely with Maritza Cruz, someone who he got involved with on a personal level.  Soon, Cruz became the first woman who he got close to falling in love with.  However, this relationship caused a strain on his and Faith's friendship, with the first major crack appearing when she found out about Bosco's participation in Cruz's illegal police activities.

Eventually, Bosco and Faith's bond suffered its biggest blow when he went to her for help, due to the trouble Cruz's do-anything-for-evidence attitude had led to with writer and informant Aaron Noble. Bosco needed Faith to go to Noble's apartment and retrieve a gun used in a murder; the gun was evidence enough to get Noble locked away for good and prove that Cruz was going against the book. Faith grudgingly consented, but at the apartment she was surprised by Cruz.  During their standoff, Noble and Bosco appeared, and then rising tensions triggered a shootout. Bosco's fire killed Noble; Faith was shot and temporarily paralyzed by Cruz, while Cruz received a minor bullet wound to the head. Bosco took responsibility for the incident to save Faith, but the damage was done, and Faith told Bosco she never wanted to see him again. Bosco was then partnered with Sasha Monroe, and soon faced difficulties involving small-time crook Ally Nardo, who continuously involved Bosco's mother in problems. Nardo took her hostage, drawing Bosco into a furious search. Bosco eventually found his mother, whereupon Nardo killed himself despite the offer of witness protection. When Faith fully recovered, she requested to be partnered with Bosco again, saying that if she wanted to go back to work it was going to be properly; i.e., going back to '55 David', their patrol number. Bosco was hesitant, and didn't tell the chief of the request. But eventually they were put back together, although they seemed very distant.

A later development saw Bosco's brother Mikey (who was into drugs) become suspected of drug running by Cruz, making Bosco realize she had been using him the entire time. It was later discovered that Mikey was indeed involved with the drugs; in the process he was killed by drug lord Donald Mann, who believed that Bosco, Cruz and Faith were responsible for the death of his son (killed in a car chase with Cruz and Bosco). Wanting the three dead, Mann hired someone to blow up the funeral of Mikey, but the would-be assassin only succeeded in crashing a car containing the bomb into the service, seriously injuring Bosco's mom in the process. Later realizing he was unsuccessful in killing the three, Mann sent armed men to the hospital to finish the job where a raging gunbattle ensued, critically injuring Bosco and hospitalizing him for months.

Bosco would later return to work (with a large scar on his face) and be partnered with Sully.  Faith believed he had come back too early as he was having trouble seeing, and accused him of falsifying his shooting score so as to rush himself back onto the force. This angered Bosco greatly, and once again put their relationship under heavy strain.  Unfortunately, it appeared her assumptions were right when Bosco accidentally shot Monroe in the stomach during a hostage situation, causing her to lose her baby. Bosco informed the chief that it was an accident, even with Faith knowing otherwise.  Later, Bosco redeemed himself somewhat when Faith's daughter, Emily was taken hostage; he shot and killed the hostage taker, saving her life.

In the shows final episode, Bosco accompanied Cruz as she went to stop a drug lord from killing cops.  Cruz kissed Bosco before entering the man's hideout, at which point she killed herself, the drug lord and his entire gang by detonating two grenades she smuggled in.  At the end of the episode, Bosco transferred to the 79th Precinct in Bed-Stuy, where he continued doing the "same thing he'd always done, kicking' ass, taking names and being the police", as Sully put it.

Bobby Caffey

Roberto 'Bobby' Caffey was a paramedic on Third Watch for the first 2 seasons. He was portrayed by Bobby Cannavale

Personality
Bobby was a kind-hearted paramedic who only wanted to help people, which led to him being seen by some as "mothering" them. He was very loyal to his friends and family, and frequently listened to the problems of others, although there were times when he wanted someone to talk to as well. He was deeply religious, and also liked to box.

Background
Bobby was born around 1973 or 1974. His father left the family when he was a youngster and died many years later. He was devoted to his family and, when his older brother, Matty began using drugs, he became the "man of the family". His mother later remarried and the whole family adopted the last name "Caffey." His best friend, Paulie Fuentes, played a major role in his life. Bobby credited his high school geometry teacher, Mrs Bradley, with saving him from going down the same route as Matty and Paulie; He later repaid the debt by helping euthanize her so she could die peacefully.

Bobby was a paramedic for a number of years, and worked with Kim Zambrano for the last 6 of his life. Though he had a crush on Kim since the day they met, she turned him down when he finally revealed his feelings for her, saying he was too good for her and she'd let him down in the end; They did have a one-night stand, which resulted in Kim dumping him. However, the two recovered from this and remained friends. Bobby also got on well with Kim's son, Joey, and adopted the role of a second father to him. He regularly put up with Kim's rants about her ex-husband, firefighter Jimmy Doherty, who in many ways was his rival. Bobby also had a short relationship with Dana Murphy, an ER nurse from Angel of Mercy Hospital, and firefighter Alex Taylor.

Bobby was seen as one of the nicest guys around, often helping out anyone in need no matter what the situation. When a 13-year-old girl named Sunny was being pimped out, both Bobby and Kim tried to help her, and Sunny later stole Kim's wallet in return. Enraged, Bobby went to get the wallet and gave her pimp a bruising at the same time. He also secretly replaced the $200 Sunny had stolen, which happened to be half of Jimmy's child support money. Unfortunately, Sunny died sometime later.

Bobby tried to help his brother Matty numerous times. In 2000, Matty was released from jail and, due to Mrs. Caffey wanting nothing to do with her older son, he ended up staying with Bobby. Bobby always forgave him for his deceptions and betrayals, which included having an affair with one of Bobby's girlfriends, Serena Cadiz, stealing a large amount of money Bobby had put aside to lend his mother, and stealing Bobby's Ford Mustang. When Matty was involved in a store robbery, which ended up with the cashier getting killed, Bobby gave Matty $500 and told him that if he took the money, he didn't want to ever hear from him again; Matty would be dead to him. But if he turned himself in, he'd do everything he could to make sure Matty didn't do time. Matty decided not to turn himself in, breaking Bobby's heart. It was this incident that led to Bobby and Kim's one night stand.

Bobby met his end near the end of the second season. An old girlfriend of his, Gina (to whom Bobby had lost his virginity many years earlier), asked him to help out Paulie, her brother and his childhood friend. Paulie was involved with drugs and, when Bobby saw Paulie after a number of years, the latter was passed out. Perhaps feeling guilty after failing to help his brother, Bobby took Paulie to the hospital and offered him the chance to enter rehab; Paulie rejected this offer. Later that night, Paulie went by Bobby's, feeling sick. Bobby helped his friend on the condition that Paulie enter rehab. The next day, Bobby got the call that his mom's apartment had been robbed. When he found out Paulie was responsible, he went to Paulie's place and confronted him. Bobby threw Paulie's stash into a toilet, and was subsequently shot and killed.

After his death, Kim, overcome with grief, attempted suicide by overdosing on pills and alcohol in the bath.

Casting
Regarding the role, Cannavale once said there were times he'd forget it was just an acting job. "I was on the subway one night and saw this guy collapse and start shaking on the floor. I just finished this trauma scene. I have no medical experience and I run over there and tell somebody to call 911."

Maritza Cruz

Maritza Cruz was a fictional police officer on the television series Third Watch portrayed by Tia Texada.  She appeared in the last three seasons of the show. An Anti-Crime Sergeant with the fictional 55th Precinct of the NYPD, she was known for doing whatever it took to get the job done.

Her only known relative, a sister named Leticia ("Lettie"), died of a drug overdose during a raid.  At one point during her career, Cruz had a relationship with Bosco, which ended when Faith Yokas and Cruz shot each other in self-defense in a hotel room during an illegal search.  The shooting resulted in Faith being hospitalized and Cruz sent back to Patrol from Anti Crime.

Cruz came under the microscope of IAB several times; one of which ended up with her in prison for the murder of a suspect.  However Faith, the real killer, admitted to shooting a crime lord responsible for the murder of several 55th Precinct Officers (after gaining immunity from any punishment).

In the series' final episode, Bosco accompanied Cruz as she went to stop a drug lord from killing cops. Cruz kissed Bosco before entering the man's hideout, at which point she killed herself, the drug lord and his entire gang by detonating two grenades she smuggled in.  Whether this act was connected to her having also been diagnosed with terminal leukemia is not explored. Cruz was awarded the NYPD Medal of Honor and posthumously promoted to the rank of lieutenant.  Her tombstone was also shown in the last episode showing her birth and death date, as well as the date of the attack on the 55th Precinct.

Maritza's death date, May 6, 2005, is also when the series finale was aired.

Tyrone 'Ty' Davis Jr.

Tyrone "Ty" Davis Jr.. is a fictional NYPD police officer from the television series Third Watch. He was portrayed by Coby Bell.

Personality
Ty started out as an inexperienced rookie, but soon developed into a strong cop. He is fairly laid back most of the time, apart from when an issue directly affecting him, his family or his friends occurs. Ty can be very stubborn but is also very loyal to those he cares about, especially his mother and his partner, Sully. Ty likes listening to rap music and has size 17 feet. He is about 6'3" in height.

Background
Ty was born the only son of his parents, Tyrone Sr. and Maggie Davis. He has 2 sisters. When Ty was 11, his father, also an NYPD cop, was killed in the line of duty. Ty Sr. was a corrupt cop, something Ty Jr. was unaware of until later in life. He was involved in a group of corrupt cops, but decided to report them to IAB. Another member of the group, Cathal Finney, arranged for Ty Sr. to be murdered by a criminal named Raymond Morris and make it look like an accident. Ty Sr.'s partner, John 'Sully' Sullivan, found out the truth, but decided not to report it so Maggie would still be entitled to her late husband's pension.

Ty Jr. graduated from Columbia University, but had always wanted to be a cop like his father and despite being accepted to Fordham law, decided to take a year out and become a cop, to see if it was what he really wanted to do. At the insistence of Maggie, who called the Borough Commander, Ty was partnered up with his dad's old partner, Sully. The two clashed at first - Ty's rookie status contrasted with Sully's veteran "been there, done that" attitude. Ty had a hard time at first separating "justice" from the "justice system" and at first disagreed with Sully's "solving problems" style of policing; however, the two soon became friends, working in the squad car 55 Charlie.

In 2000, Ty saved a news reporter from drowning and became a hero, attracting media coverage. This led his half-sister, Gwen Girard, to find Ty and meet up with him. Ty discovered his father had had another family, and that his family and Sully all seemed to know about this before he did. Angry at everyone around him, Ty moved out of his mother's house and into an apartment. He later moved in with Carlos Nieto as a roommate.

After the events of September 11, Ty bonded with Alex Taylor, a firefighter who had lost her father in the attacks. Having both lost their fathers in the line of duty, the two realized they had something in common and began a relationship. This changed though after Ty got shot, and they started feeling differently. When he introduced Alex to Maggie as his "friend," this marked the beginning of the end. After Alex died, Ty felt very guilty.

Ty was the best man at Sully's wedding to Tatiana and after she was murdered, he was one of the few people who did not give up on Sully after his descent into alcoholism. Ty, with help from Bosco and Doc, took Sully to a cabin where he helped his friend on the road to recovery.

Ty had to be a chauffeur to Chief Hancock for a while, but later returned to 55 Charlie with Sully. Ty started dating Sasha Monroe in 2004. She became pregnant with his baby but miscarried. After Sasha was exposed as a 'mole' from IAB, most of the cops shunned her, but Ty and Sasha managed to repair their relationship. He and Sully also managed to expose Cathal Finney for his role in Ty's father's death, and Finney committed suicide. Ty and new partner Brendan Finney (Cathals' son) made it look like an accident so that Mrs. Finney could still claim police pension, just as had been done with Ty Sr. years earlier. After the 55th Precinct was closed at the end of the series, Ty, along with Brendan Finney, was transferred to an Anti-Crime unit, where he rose through the ranks to become Lieutenant Davis, running half of Manhattan. He is engaged to Sasha, although they are not getting married as yet due to their careers.

James 'Jimmy' Doherty

James "Jimmy" Doherty was a fictional FDNY firefighter in the television series Third Watch, portrayed by actor Eddie Cibrian. He was in the series from 1999 until 2004 and then returned for a cameo in the show's final episode a year later.

Personality
Jimmy is good-looking, and he knows it. He takes pride in his job and has even admitted he'd do it for free - just don't tell the Mayor! This, plus his looks, means he attracts a lot of female attention, which he happily embraces. Jimmy often defends his masculinity - he was horrified to learn his face was featured in a commercial for Viagra, until he learned this made him more attractive to women. Jimmy is immature and not good at facing responsibilities, although over the course of the series, he does grow up and start accepting the consequences of his actions, including being a better father to his son.

Jimmy had an ongoing rivalry with Maurice 'Bosco' Boscorelli, the two men playing numerous practical jokes on each other to one up the other.

Background
Jimmy, born in 1968 (his age was given as 35 in his final episode [2005]) originally wanted to become a baseball player, and even tried out for the New York Yankees in 1993. He failed to make the team, and joined the FDNY as his "back-up" option. This soon became his chosen profession.

Jimmy was married to paramedic Kim Zambrano before the series started. They married in Atlantic City and later Kim gave birth to their son, Joey (named after Jimmy's best friend, Joe Lombardo). Jimmy had an affair with Kim's sister, Melanie, and Kim filed for divorce. They shared custody of Joey, both seeing each other every day as they worked at the same time in the same firehouse. Jimmy often competed for Kim's affection against her work partner, Bobby Caffey - she was still the love of his life despite the divorce.

Jimmy had been gambling for a while and was soon in debt, causing his child support payments to Kim and Joey to be late. He'd tried borrowing money from his family - but his parents (who pay Joey's school fees) were organizing a trip for his father's birthday, and brother Tommy had already lent Jimmy money in the past. He has another brother, Jack, who lives in Pittsburgh. Jimmy ended up having to give up his car to pay off his debts, an act which Joey witnessed. Jimmy had to walk Joey home in the cold. After this, he vowed to become a better father. At the end of the first season, Jimmy was shot by an ex-fireman who had gone slightly insane, and spent many weeks in a hospital. He returned to work too early, trying to regain past glories, but later realized he should not return until he was completely ready.

Jimmy (thanks to Joey) met a police officer, Brooke (from another precinct) in a supermarket and they soon fell in love. After a whirlwind romance, Jimmy proposed, but at their engagement party, he had sex in the bathroom at the party with Joe Lombardo's girlfriend Linda. This was witnessed by Alex Taylor, and later the secret came out (Linda confessed to Joe) which caused Joe to punch Jimmy in the face and Brooke to file for divorce. Joe and Jimmy later made up, although Jimmy's marriage was over.

After Bobby was murdered, Kim sank into a state of depression, causing Jimmy to try and win sole custody of Joey. He won, but later allowed Kim access again after seeing how much she had improved.

After the deaths of Alex and Lt Johnson, Jimmy was promoted to Lieutenant. He made a few mistakes at first, which caused tension between him and the others. At the same time, Kim and Jimmy started falling in love again, and had numerous one night stands during the course of the series. Jimmy later proposed to Kim, and she accepted. However, when Jimmy nearly died that day, Kim realized she couldn't go through the emotions of being a firefighter's wife again, and broke things off. Jimmy had gained another promotion to Captain, a coveted position in Brooklyn's Rescue-2, and left the 55. Kim was however pregnant, and later realized she still loved Jimmy. She quit her job and she and Joey moved to be with him, where she gave birth to their second child, Kevin. The family reappeared in the final episode at Carlos Nieto's and Holly Levine's wedding.

Brendan Finney

Brendan Finney is a fictional NYPD police officer from the television series Third Watch. He was portrayed by Josh Stewart.

Personality
Brendan comes from a long line of cops, and regards it as "the family business." He's a bit rough around the edges and often has attitude problems. In his spare time he likes to box, and is also a good shooter.

Background
Brendan is the son of Cathal "CT" Finney, who was a captain in IAB. Brendan deeply admired his father, although at times their relationship was not that close he still loved him. His father had first taught him to shoot when he was young.

Brendan's father was involved in the death of Ty Davis' father, Tyrone Sr many years before the series began, and as such Brendan was met with much hostility from John 'Sully' Sullivan, who knew the truth about the death. Brendan however did not know of this. As a probationary officer, he was teamed with Ty, and despite a few initial hiccups after starting (one of which was a death notification) the two bonded. Finney had a romantic interest FDNY Paramedic Grace Foster, who worked across the street at the firehouse. After killing a guy who was attacking Grace and her partner, Carlos Nieto, the two became distant but soon started speaking again.

When the truth about Ty Davis, Sr's death came out, Cathal Finney decided to commit suicide. He called his son and told him he loved him, which tipped Brendan off that something was wrong. In a case of history repeating itself, Brendan begged Ty to help him make the death look like an accident so his mother could still claim a police pension - just as had been done with Ty Davis, Sr many years before.

After the series ended, Brendan and Grace got married, and were expecting their first child together just before their first anniversary. Brendan was transferred to the 5–3 with Ty Davis to work in an Anti-Crime Unit. Within a few years, he was promoted to the rank of Sergeant, under the now Lt Davis' command. They have the best arrest record in the city.

Grace Foster

Grace Foster is a fictional character on the television series Third Watch; she is portrayed by Cara Buono.

Personality
Grace Foster is a paramedic who was transferred from the "war zone" of Bedford-Stuyvesant (which she loved) to the 55th Precinct. She is known to have a hot-headed, tough-as-nails personality, which initially irked her fellow paramedics. She described the 55th Precinct as a "Country Club" assignment until Carlos Nieto set her straight.

Background

Sasha Monroe

Sasha Monroe is a fictional character on the television series Third Watch; she was portrayed by Nia Long.

Monroe is a police officer in the 55th Precinct of the NYPD. She was originally posted to the 11PM to 7AM shift (the first watch); however, she later joined the third watch. Monroe developed a relationship with Officer Davis; however, this fell through when it was revealed that Monroe was a detective with Internal Affairs Bureau.

As an informant detective for IAB; her role was to gather information on Anti-Crime Sergeant Maritza Cruz. During this time, she develops a friendship with Detective Yokas in attempt to gain information regarding Cruz and the shooting of a handcuffed prisoner.

After Monroe's cover is blown, Captain Finney leaves her in the 55th Precinct. During her time as a social outcast within the third watch, she helps Sully and Davis take down Capt Finney for the murder of Davis' father. Despite the friction in her relationship with Davis, they finally get back together after Monroe was shot accidentally by Bosco. During the shooting, Monroe loses her unborn child. It was only then that Davis found out that he was the father.

In the final episode of the series, it is revealed that, after retiring from the NYPD, Monroe makes a run for office as a city council member. She continues to date Davis; however, due to their hectic work schedule they are yet to be married.

Her family consists of her father and mother, sister, two nieces, and a nephew.

Carlos Nieto

Carlos Nieto is a fictional FDNY paramedic on the television series Third Watch. He was portrayed by Anthony Ruivivar and was the only paramedic to stay for the duration of the series.

Background
Carlos Nieto was born on May 11, 1975 (although in one episode, "Band of Brothers," he claims he was born in 1977) in Hawaii. He is of Filipino heritage and was originally named Adam, and had an older brother named Christian.  After their parents split up, Christian stayed with their mother, while their father took Adam to New York. Their father was the victim of a hit-and-run vehicle accident, which killed him. Young Carlos was found holding his father's hand. In the aftermath of his father's death, Carlos was placed in an orphanage run by nuns, where he grew up not knowing about his past and believing he had been abandoned by his mother at the orphanage. He went through 6 or 7 foster homes, and one of his foster mothers was named Lucinda Harding.

After leaving school, Carlos joined the Marines, serving as a medic (this is a goof since the Marines do not have medical personnel, Corpsmen are provided by the United States Navy). After his discharge, Carlos wished to attend medical school. To earn some money during his schooling, he joined the FDNY as a paramedic, where he was partnered up with Monte 'Doc' Parker. The two men did not get along at first, especially after Doc's partner Jerry left on disability pay, and they came to blows a few times. However, Carlos looked up to Doc as a father figure, and was annoyed when Doc reassigned him to be partnered him with another paramedic, Alex Taylor. Doc did this so he himself could ride with paramedic Kim Zambrano following her return to work. Carlos' other friends include his roommate Ty Davis, and his pet cockatoo (Walter), which he obtained from a dead homeless guy.

Not long after starting work, Carlos and Doc treated a girl named Vangie. She fell for Carlos and they started dating, but she turned to be mentally unstable and Carlos broke it off with her. This caused her to attempt suicide, after which she revealed she was pregnant. Carlos offered to pay for an abortion, but Vangie merely told him he "wouldn't have to worry about it anymore." Two years later, Carlos learned that he was a father to daughter Kylie, after the sister of now-deceased Vangie dumped Kylie on him. Carlos fell for his daughter at once and wanted to keep her, but in the end, he realized he could not give her a family like he'd always wanted, so he put her up for adoption. She was adopted by the Kenney family in an open adoption, meaning Carlos still sees his daughter regularly.

In 2003, Carlos was suspended after allegations that he had abused a teenage girl, Nicole West, in the ambulance. It had been a simple, accidental touch for which he had apologized to her straight-away, but no one at the firehouse, apart from Doc, believed him. Carlos offered to resign, as being dismissed could prevent him from seeing his daughter and could ruin his chances of going to medical school. During a severe snowstorm, Doc put Carlos back on active duty, an action which got Doc into trouble. As part of the settlement against the West family, Carlos was dismissed. It later turned out that Nicole was really being abused by her stepfather, and was trying to reach out for help by blaming Carlos. When the truth was revealed, Carlos was reinstated in his job. After that incident was resolved, Carlos decided that being a paramedic was what he really wanted to do, and decided not to go to medical school.

A year later, Carlos found out that his daughter Kylie had a medical condition known as idiopathic aplastic anemia and that she needed a bone marrow transplant. He offered his marrow, but he was not a match. This led him to try to find his biological family to save Kylie, and allowed his brother to finally find him. Christian was a match, and told Carlos of his true origins.

After Doc slowly started going insane, which ended up with him shooting Captain Steeper, Carlos was the first to defy his friend and treat Steeper, trusting Doc would not harm him (which he didn't). When Doc ended up in Bellevue Mental Hospital, Carlos kept in contact with his former mentor. In the final episode of the series, Carlos proposed to Holly, and after they married, they moved to Staten Island, where they had three children.

Monte 'Doc' Parker

Monte 'Doc' Parker is a fictional FDNY paramedic on the television show Third Watch. He was portrayed by Michael Beach. Doc appeared in the first four and a half seasons, and in the final episode as a cameo.

Personality
Doc is the paramedic supervisor at the firehouse and is in charge of everyone else. He's one of the best paramedics in the city, but often takes the job too seriously and lets his emotions get in the way. Doc will take the blame for many incidents, even if they were not directly his fault. Doc is quite possibly the most conflicted character in the entire series, dealing with many traumatic events and occurrences from his past as well as during the course of his time on the show.

Background
Monte 'Doc' Parker was born in 1962 in New York City, one of 5 sons of John and Mrs Parker. As a youngster, he accidentally killed his best friend over a girl, something that would come back and haunt him in the future. After high school, Monte spent four years at City College, studying business and administration. After graduating, he spent 2 years selling stereos before switching to office suppliers. Bored, Monte considered joining the Air Force, but was turned down due to poor eyesight. He ended up joining the FDNY in 1985 as a paramedic (an error, since the FDNY did not provide EMS until the merger of 1996), after seeing paramedics in the street and thinking the job looked good. He acquired the nickname 'Doc' and was partnered up with Jerry Markowitz; the two regarded themselves as brothers. Jerry helped Doc overcome the death of his wife Debra, who was killed in a boating accident in 1998. Doc and Debra's last words to each other had been an argument. He holds a Black Belt in Tae Kwon Do (World Tae Kwon Do Federation).

In 1999 rookie Carlos Nieto joined the paramedics, and on this day Jerry was shot. Carlos became Doc's partner, but Doc considered him temporary until Jerry got back. When he found out that Jerry was taking permanent retirement on disability pay, Doc took the news hard. Carlos then became his permanent partner, but the two had very different styles and more than once, Carlos thought about getting a transfer. They also competed for the affections of ER doctor Sara Morales, eventually Doc "won" - she was the first woman since his wife died with whom he felt comfortable, and the two began a relationship.

Doc's father John, a widower like his son, took an overdose of his medication and Doc and Sara managed to save him. What looked like a simple accident was soon revealed to be deliberate - John Parker's quality of life was slipping away and he wanted to die. Eventually, Doc helped his father to die. Doc and Sara later broke up in 2001 when she accepted a job in Philadelphia and he wished to stay in New York.

Doc was nominated for "Paramedic Of The Year" in 2002, but was caught on camera (he was being filmed by a documentary crew) performing medical procedures that almost paralyzed a young man. Doc felt guilty over this. Later, when an explosion killed Alex Taylor and Lt Johnson, Doc took the news very badly as his guilt increased. He accepted a promotion to a desk job, but was demoted back down to normal paramedic after beating up the guy whom Alex had replaced on the day she died.

Doc left the series in 2004 when a new captain was assigned to the firehouse, replacing Jimmy Doherty. The new captain had a reputation for closing down firehouses. Doc snapped and shot him. He intended to hold him hostage for the length of time it would take a paramedic to reach the neighbourhood if the station was shut down. It soon become apparent that the true cause of Doc's actions, in addition to the sum of all the painful and traumatic events in his life, was his inability to deal with the horror of the September 11, 2001 terrorist attacks, even three years later. Once his good friend NYPD officer John Sullivan convinced him to surrender, Doc was arrested and sent to Bellevue Hospital Center, where he remained until the end of the show.

John "Sully" Sullivan

John Thomas "Sully" Sullivan is a fictional NYPD police officer from the television series Third Watch. He was portrayed by Skipp Sudduth.

Background
John Sullivan was born in New York in 1957. He has a sister, Fran, who later moved to Orlando, Florida with her now ex-husband Mike. Sully once served in the United States Marine Corps (referenced in S01E07 "Impulse") before he joined the NYPD, starting work at the 55th precinct where his training officer was Tyrone Davis, Sr. The two men eventually became partners and were like brothers. Ty Sr however was in with a group of corrupt cops, including Cathal Finney, who discovered that Ty Sr was planning to turn the others in. CT arranged for Ty Sr to be murdered to silence him. This hit Sully a lot, he stopped going to church after this day and described as "the worst day of his life." Sully later found out the truth about the murder but said nothing to protect the Davis family and to make sure Maggie Davis still got her late husband's pension.

Sully went through a few other partners, including one who would later accuse him of falsifying evidence, and another who committed suicide after being forced to retire. In 1999, he acquired a new partner in Tyrone Davis Jr., the son of his first partner. Although initially reluctant to take Ty Jr on, the two men soon bonded and became firm friends. A year later, Sully met his new neighbour, Tatiana, who was Ukrainian. They fell in love and started dating, but Sully was shocked by the sudden appearance of her son Sergei, whom she had not mentioned beforehand. Sully did not know that Tatiana was really called Natasha and worked for a Russian mob boss, Fyodor Chevchenko.

The two were set to marry on September 11, 2001 in Atlantic City but the day's events caused the wedding to be postponed. They eventually married, with Ty as best man, in New York on October 1. A few months after their marriage, Sergei was beaten up by Chevchenko's men. Sully, with Ty, went to see Chevchenko causing Ty to get shot. Sully felt guilty at this, and Tatiana was not happy with Sully for interfering. She later left Sully, returning two months later claiming to have been with relatives upstate. In reality, she had been working at Chevchenko's club. When Sergei returned to New York later, he was murdered at Grand Central Station, as was Tatiana when she went to see Chevchenko. In retaliation, Sully murdered Chevchenko.

The loss of his family caused Sully to drink, and eventually he became an alcoholic. Ty, worried about his partner, reported him to the union. Sully later begged Ty for help - a few days later, Ty, Bosco and Doc took Sully up to a cabin to dry out. Sully said some hurtful things to each of them, but with their help overcame his drinking problem and returned to work.

The truth about Ty Sr's death came out in 2004 after Cathal Finney's son Brendan joined the force. Ty was partnered with Brendan and Sully with Sasha Monroe, who became pregnant with Ty's baby. Sully urged her to tell him about it, but she miscarried.

In the final episode, Sully decided to retire, since he had always worked at the 55 and did not want to work at another precinct. He now owns a cabin by a lake, where he spends his time fishing.

Alex Taylor

Alexandra 'Alex' Taylor is a fictional character played by actress Amy Carlson on the television series Third Watch, between 2000 and 2003, during its second, third, and fourth seasons. She was the only Third Watch  character to serve as both a firefighter and a paramedic.

Personality
Alex was always a tomboy who, according to her mother, always followed her father around, doing whatever he did. Despite being the only female on the squad, she fit in well with "the guys." Alex was a good football player, and often gave the boys a run for their money. She was a firm believer in things being "wrong" or "right" and thus, sometimes couldn't see a middle ground. She loved her family deeply, but often worried that she wasn't good enough to please her father, and wanted to make him proud (which he was anyway). Although it appeared she was "always looking sad" and whined a bit, she cared deeply about anyone she saved, whether as a medic or a firefighter.

Background
From a young age, Alex wanted to be a firefighter like her father, Angus, and played with toy fire trucks rather than Barbies. Her brother, Adam, became a nurse, leaving Alex free to follow the family tradition. Alex graduated from the fire academy and received from her father a Saint Florian medallion, one of her prized possessions.

Alex started work with the FDNY, previously working at another section with Danny Gamble, a friend of Jimmy Doherty. She sued him for sexual assault, but lost the case and thus asked to be transferred to another firehouse. Arriving at the 55 as a firefighter, it was revealed she used to be a paramedic before "moving up" to the fire squad, and often worked as a medic during her time at the 55. Alex soon settled in, originally being treated as a "girly" girl before the others found out what she was really like. Despite the initial tension between her and Jimmy over the Danny Gamble case, they became friends after Jimmy found out what Gamble was really like.

Her father was killed as the South Tower collapsed on 9/11. Alex took his death very hard, and spent all her free time down at "the pile" helping the rescuers. This eventually led Lieutenant Johnson to move her to the paramedic side of the squad, where she rode with Kim Zambrano, as he did not want to lose "another member of his squad." Alex originally rode with Carlos Nieto, as Kim (who had recently returned to work following a suicide attempt) was riding with Doc, but after Kim proved herself fit for duty she and Alex were partnered up. Being the only women in the firehouse, the two developed a strong friendship but, despite this, Alex wanted to return to firefighting. She was annoyed when a new firefighter, Prescott, arrived, fearing he'd take her place in the squad. It turned out that Prescott knew of Alex, as he worked with her father soon after joining up.

Angus Taylor's body was found 233 days after 9/11. He received a hero's burial, and Alex returned to firefighting not long afterward.

Alex started dating Ty Davis during the show's third season after he comforted her over the death of her father. They kept the relationship secret, but eventually, Ty realized they didn't have enough in common to keep a relationship going. After ending up in the hospital due to being shot, he introduced Alex to his mother as a "friend" rather than a girlfriend.

In 2002, Alex was severely injured in a car crash and, though she recovered and returned to work, she met her end a year later. A new paramedic named Eugene had not turned up for work, so Alex was asked to work the shift instead. While comforting an injured couple in a car accident, the car she was sitting in exploded, literally blowing her in half. She died moments later in Carlos' arms, her final request was for him to tell her Mother "it didn't hurt"; he honoured her by including it in his eulogy of her at her funeral.

Faith Yokas

Faith P Yokas (née Mitchell) is a fictional character played by actress Molly Price on the television series Third Watch, which ran from 1999 to 2005. Her life revolved around her job and family drama.

Background
Faith grew up with an alcoholic father and a doormat mother, and was determined not to turn out the same way. She did turn up home drunk as a teenager, which caused her mother to admit she'd failed as a mother. This made a lasting impression on the young Faith.

She met her husband Fred Yokas in college, and they married in 1989. They had two children, Emily and Charlie.  After going through several part-time jobs, such as off-duty security at a pharmacy, and "the record store police" and the "hamburger place police", Faith decided to become a cop in 1995 to have an opportunity to leave her husband. She later decided to stay with him. Fred resented Faith's decision to become a cop, feeling that her focus on her job resulted in neglect of him and their children. Faith does worry about this, especially when Emily became a teenager. Faith once, while still married to him, arrested Fred for drunk driving.

Faith was partnered with Maurice 'Bosco' Boscorelli, whom she met and tutored at the Academy. They patrolled their sector of the 55th Precinct in an RMP (Radio Motor Patrol, the NYPD term for a marked police car) whose call sign was "Five Five David."  Faith would often treat Bosco as if he were one of her children. Fred resented the relationship between his wife and Bosco and as such did not get along with Bosco.

Faith had an abortion during the show's second season, without telling anyone. She'd felt the time wasn't right to have a third child. She lied to that everyone she'd miscarried, but accidentally let slip to Bosco what really happened. When Fred found out, he was hurt by his wife's lie.

Faith thought she might have breast cancer and on September 11, 2001 she went to see the doctor with Fred. After finding out that the lump may be harmless, the terrorist attacks happened and Faith went to the scene to help, despite it being her day off. She later had surgery to remove the risk of the cancer developing, and was prepared to have a mastectomy if needed. Luckily this was unnecessary, and Faith made a full recovery.

In 2002, Faith thought of applying for the sergeant's test. She was accepted, to the joy of both her and Fred who thought she might be able to work better hours for more money and spent more time with her family. However, Bosco had been suffering from panic attacks due to 9/11 (although he was unaware why at this time) and upon discovering that Bosco needed help, Faith failed the test so she could help him. This angered Fred, who stormed out - but returned to find Bosco breaking down in front of Faith. Bosco later saved Faith and Emily after they were held hostage in a bank.

Faith and Bosco split up at the end of the fourth season after Faith discovered Bosco had been lying to her about his involvement with Sgt Maritza Cruz. She was partnered up with Sasha Monroe. Later, Faith reluctantly accepted a promotion to detective, knowing she'd lied about murdering a man, which had led to the promotion.

Faith and Fred divorced during the show's fifth season after Fred, tired of his wife's uncaring attitude to their marriage, met someone else. Fred left, taking the children with him, and a custody battle arose between him and Faith. Despite Fred winning custody of the children, Emily chose to live with her mother, while Charlie went to live with Fred. Later on in the series finale, after the 55th precinct was shut down, it was revealed that Faith Yokas reported to Major Crimes and found out that her boss was Captain Miller. They were thinking about moving in together once Emily finishes college.

Fred Yokas

Fred Yokas is a fictional character on the television series Third Watch, played by actor Chris Bauer.  He was the husband of police officer Faith Yokas. He was a recurring character in the first two seasons, and a regular character after that point.

Personality
Fred deeply loved his wife and children, but was very jealous over his wife's (working) relationship with her partner, Maurice 'Bosco' Boscorelli.  Fred and Bosco did not like each other that much.  Fred was always worrying about Faith while she was at work, and frequently wanted her to either quit her job or get desk duty to minimise the risk to her safety (and get away from Bosco). Fred's "cop's spouse dilemma" as it was approached in "Third Watch" represented an advance in gender issues as portrayed in television and cinema, in that previous series and films where the syndrome appeared, it was always the wife worrying about the officer husband. "Third Watch" stood as an indicator that the gender roles could be reversed and the same bone of contention could exist.

Background
Fred met Faith at college, where he was on the wrestling team. They fell in love and got married, and later had two children: daughter Emily and son Charlie; however, the Yokas family soon hit financial difficulties, partly caused by Fred's growing alcohol problems.  Faith's father had been an alcoholic and she did not want her children to end up with a father like hers.

Faith joined the NYPD, and due to her hours, Fred was there for the children in the afternoon. When Emily started pre-school Fred did not leave all day.  As time went on, Fred lost his job and his drinking problems got worse - this ultimately led him to be arrested by his wife when he drove to pick the children up from school while drunk. After this, Faith threw Fred out, but after he agreed to go to AA meetings she let him come home. Problems continued as Fred started skipping meetings, thinking his wife didn't understand. In the end, she agreed to go to Al-Anon to help him, and the two of them worked together to help Fred quit alcohol.

Fred found out that Faith had had an abortion some time earlier (she had felt they could not afford to have a third child) and was both hurt and angry at his wife. After she went to stay with her parents, she and Fred got back together.

The longer Faith spent in the job, the greater Fred's resentment of Bosco (and the cops in general) grew. After Faith failed her sergeant's exams to help Bosco, Fred blamed Bosco. At the end of the third season, Fred had a heart attack while trapped in an elevator, but he made it to the hospital on time and recovered. He became a born-again Christian after his scare.

In 2003, Faith was shot by Maritza Cruz after she went to help Bosco. Fred blamed Bosco for everything and told him he'd kill him if he ever came near the Yokas family again. Fred was furious when Faith wanted to return to work (after being disabled) and re-partner with Bosco, and soon met Caroline, who he started having an affair with. Fred served Faith with divorce papers and won custody of the children, although Emily later opted to live with her mother instead.

Kim Zambrano

Kim Zambrano is a fictional FDNY paramedic on the television series Third Watch. She was portrayed by Kim Raver. Kim appeared in the first five seasons, as well as the first episode of season 6, and a cameo in the series finale.

Personality
She did not have much stability in her life as a child and has found as an adult, she still doesn't have any. Kim is divorced from Jimmy Doherty, and they have a son together, but never got over him and continually finds herself drawn back to him.

Background
Kim was one of two children and grew up with her single mother. Her mother married several times, but also continually flew around the country in search of her husband so Kim and her sister Melanie could grow up with a father.

She joined FDNY as a paramedic and was partnered with Bobby Caffey, who would become her closest friend. During this time, she became romantically involved with firefighter Jimmy Doherty, with whom she got pregnant and married. Kim caught Jimmy cheating on her with her sister, so the two soon got divorced and she stopped speaking to her sister. Kim took custody of their son, Joey, although Jimmy remained very much a part of his son's life.

Bobby and Kim had a very close relationship, which got awkward when Bobby revealed that he was in love with her. Kim admitted she had feelings for him, but didn't want to act on them because he was her best friend. The two slept together when Bobby's brother ran away, and Kim had to tell Bobby the next day it was a mistake, even though Bobby believed they were finally together. Kim would continually drift back to Jimmy, who constantly admitted to still having feelings for Kim, much to Bobby's dismay.

In season 2, Bobby was fatally shot, and Kim took it incredibly rough. She attempted suicide and became depressed. She finally returned to work in season 3 and was partnered with part-time paramedic, part-time firefighter Alex Taylor. Shortly after she returned to work, Jimmy attempted to gain sole custody of Joey due to her depression. He was temporarily successful, but Kim would eventually regain joint custody.

In season 4, Kim became romantically involved with writer Aaron Noble. Unbeknownst to her, he was heavily involved in the drug community while working undercover for his new book, and was extremely valuable to the police, due to the information he had. During this time, she had unprotected sex with him, giving her a scare that she might have been infected with a disease. Kim would suffer a terrible day at the end of season 4 when, on the same day, Taylor was killed, along with Noble and Lt Johnson, the boss of the 55 firehouse. This eventually drew her back into the arms of Jimmy, and the two began dating again.

Jimmy proposed to Kim, but she turned him down, not knowing if he had really changed. But after she was attacked by men pretending to be police officers, she went back to Jimmy and accepted his offer, claiming he was the only true love of her life. Jimmy though soon got a promotion and left, leaving Kim by herself. She soon found out she was pregnant, and hid it from the rest of the firehouse. But when it came to a risky situation at Bosco's brother's funeral, she refused to go in and help, which lead to her revealing she was pregnant. She then decided to leave FDNY and remarry Jimmy. She was seen once again in the series finale with Jimmy, their son Joey and their new son, Kevin, at Carlos and Holly's wedding.

Minor characters

Firefighters

Lieutenant Johnson
Lt Johnson (frequently referred to as "Lou") was in charge of the firehouse from 2000 until 2003. He was married to Ruth and has a few children. Johnson has worked three jobs to keep money coming in for his family. He had been studying for the captain's test in 2001, but after 9/11 decided against this, as this would mean moving to a new firehouse, and he wished to stay with the 55. He died in 2003 as a result of the explosion which killed Alex Taylor, much to the grief of his family and those at the 55. His first name was never revealed in the series. Played by John Michael Bolger.

Firefighter Derek "DK" Kitson
Derek "DK" Kitson often did the cooking at the firehouse. He was usually the one coming out with the wisecracks. DK has a thing for coffee cake. He was promoted to Captain and took over the squad when Billy Walsh became battalion chief. Played by Derek Kelly.

Firefighter Joe Lombardo
Joe was Jimmy's best friend - this led to Jimmy even naming his son after him. Joe is the 3rd generation of his family to have the name "Joe Lombardo." He was dating Linda, who slept with Jimmy at Jimmy's engagement party, and became pregnant. When Joe found out, he slugged Jimmy in the face. Later, Jimmy was missing in a burning building, and Joe forgot their differences to go back inside and find him. Jimmy escaped and wanted to go back for Joe, but it was not safe. Luckily, Joe was rescued and taken to hospital, where he married Linda from his hospital bed. Played by Nick Sandow.

Firefighter Stu "Lotta Zs" Szczelaszczyk
Stu joined the show in 2004. His nickname arose from the number of "z"s in his surname. Carlos previously knew of Stu due to him being the center for the interdepartmental basketball team. After the series finished, he was promoted to Lieutenant and took over Jimmy Doherty's rescue squad. Played by Jason Shaw.

Firefighter Billy Walsh
Originally called Jeff Wilson, the character soon became known as Billy Walsh, the same name of the actor playing him. Little is known about him - he is married and in 2000 he mentioned his wife was expecting a baby. Played by Bill Walsh.

Police

Sergeant Jason Christopher
Sgt Christopher was the sergeant in Seasons 2 and 3. He did not particularly like Bosco. He was engaged to be married at one point, but transferred out of the 55 before being replaced by Maritza Cruz. Played by Brad Beyer.

Officer Brooke Doherty
Brooke did not work at the 55, but was assigned to the 89 precinct. She met and fell in love with Jimmy Doherty at a supermarket, thanks to Jimmy's son Joey, and the pair got married. Brooke left Jimmy after finding out he'd slept with his friend Joe Lombardo's girlfriend at his engagement party, and filed for divorce. Played by Eva LaRue.

Captain "Stick" Elchisak

Captain Elchisak, often referred to as "Stick" by senior officers, was the commanding officer for the 55th precinct at least from 1999-2002. The Captain stopped appearing after Season 3 and it is unknown whether or not he continued commanding the 55, as Lt. Swersky seemed to have all but assumed command of the precinct. His first name is never revealed. Played by James Rebhorn

Captain Cathal "CT" Finney
Father of Brendan Finney, CT worked in IAB. However, he was not as innocent as he appeared; he had been involved in the death of Tyrone Davis Senior many years earlier. He, Davis Sr and a few others had been corrupt cops, and planned to put the blame on Davis Sr. Davis Sr decided to go to IAB, but Finney found out and arranged for Davis Sr to be murdered.

Finney was in charge of an operation involving Sgt Maritza Cruz, which involved Detective Sasha Monroe going undercover as an officer. Not long after Brendan started working at the 55, Finney committed suicide as the truth about Ty Davis, Sr was threatened with exposure, and his son made it look like an accident so his family could still claim his pension and benefits.

Played by Charles Haid, apart from a flashback in "Forever Blue" where the younger Finney was played by Jeff Mantel.

Detective "Jelly" Grimaldi
"Jelly" Grimaldi was an overweight veteran homicide detective, often seen chugging coffee from a styrofoam cup, who appeared in seasons 5 and 6. He has known Sully for years. His real first name was never revealed on the show. Played by Joe Badalucco.

Officer Steve Gusler
A rookie during Season 3, Gusler didn't really fit in with the job or the precinct. He was partnered with Bosco on his first day, due to Bosco's partner Faith Yokas being on leave. Bosco did not have much time for the young rookie. Later Gusler was partnered with Faith when Bosco thought about joining ESU. Gusler usually appeared nervous and frightened, and after gravely shooting a fellow officer (accidentally) during a major shootout realized he was not meant to "walk the beat," but later became a police sketch artist. Played by Charlie McWade.

Officer Conrad "Candyman" Jones
Nicknamed because of his love of candy, Candyman was regarded as a good cop by everyone in the precinct, cops and civilians alike. The cops knew that he was prone to taking bribes and robbing drug dealers, but did not say anything about it as otherwise he was a good cop. After finding out that his father had worked with Candyman and had also taken bribes, Ty Davis fought with himself about whether to turn Candyman in especially after seeing him rob a pimp. After Candyman saved his life, Ty decided not to. Played by Wendell Pierce.

Officer Manny Santiago
Manny was a recurring character during the sixth season. He was one of the few not to be intimidated by Maritza Cruz, and was probably one of her closest friends. There was evidence that he had romantic feelings for her. After her death, he laid a red rose on her grave every morning. Manny mentioned a son in one episode, but other family members are unknown. Played by Manny Pérez.

Lieutenant Bob Swersky
Bob Swersky (named as "Dan" in one episode; Frequently referred to as "Lieu") was in charge of the 55 Precinct. Fair but firm, he was looked upon as a father figure by many of the cops, especially Bosco. He would often come to the aid of his officers when they were in trouble. Married, to a wife who often put him on a diet, he retired as a Deputy Chief after the series ended to spend time with his 12 grandchildren. Played by Joe Lisi.

References

Third Watch